A partial solar eclipse occurred on July 9, 1964. A solar eclipse occurs when the Moon passes between Earth and the Sun, thereby totally or partly obscuring the image of the Sun for a viewer on Earth. A partial solar eclipse occurs in the polar regions of the Earth when the center of the Moon's shadow misses the Earth.

Related eclipses

Solar eclipses of 1961–1964

References

External links 

1964 07 09
1964 in science
1964 07 09
July 1964 events